William Moseley may refer to:

 Bill Moseley (born 1951), American film actor and musician
 William Moseley (actor) (born 1987), English actor from The Chronicles of Narnia
 William A. Moseley (1798–1873), U.S. Representative from New York
 William Dunn Moseley (1795–1863), Governor of the U.S. state of Florida
 William G. Moseley (born 1965), geographer at Macalester College
 William G. Moseley (Massachusetts politician) (fl. early 1900s), a Massachusetts politician
 William Mosley (born 1989), American basketball player
 Bill Moseley (bowls) (born 1945), South African lawn bowls player